The Final World Tour (also referred to as The Farewell Tour) was the final concert tour by American thrash metal band Slayer, which began on May 10, 2018, and ended on November 30, 2019. The tour, consisting of 147 shows worldwide, served as a conclusion of the band's three-and-a-half-decade-long career.

Background
The tour was announced on January 22, 2018, through a video featuring a montage of press clippings, early posters and press photos spanning Slayer's entire career. Although the members of the band have never explained the decision to retire from touring, fans believe one of the reasons behind this was at the expense of vocalist/bassist Tom Araya's desire of no longer wanting to tour and spend more time with his family. The first leg of the North American tour was announced the day after, which took place in May and June 2018 and included support from Lamb of God, Anthrax, Behemoth and Testament. The second leg of the North American tour was announced on March 5, 2018; this leg took place in July and August, and featured four out of five bands from the first leg (Slayer, Lamb of God, Anthrax and Testament) and Napalm Death as the replacement for Behemoth.

On February 20, 2018, Slayer announced the first European date of the farewell tour; it was announced that they would headline the Secret Solstice Festival in Reykjavík, Iceland in June. A European leg of the farewell tour took place in November and December 2018, with support provided by Lamb of God, Anthrax and Obituary. Guitarist Gary Holt had to miss the last four dates of this tour so that he could take care of his father who was nearing the end of his life; he was filled in by former Machine Head and Vio-lence guitarist Phil Demmel.

On June 24, 2018, Slayer was announced as one of the first five bands (alongside Manowar, Carcass, Mass Hysteria and Dropkick Murphys) confirmed to play the 2019 edition of Hellfest. This was the band's first show announced for 2019, and was said to be their last show in France. Slayer also played a one-off show in Mexico at ForceFest in October 2018.

Slayer continued touring into 2019; in addition to international festival appearances, they performed in areas that the tour had not yet visited, including South America, Australia and Japan; Anthrax was the supporting act on most of the dates. Slayer toured North America in May 2019, with Lamb of God, Amon Amarth and Cannibal Corpse as the opening acts. The final North American leg of the tour took place in November 2019, and included support by Primus, Ministry and Philip H. Anselmo & The Illegals.

The band's final appearance in Chile on October 6, 2019, at the Santiago Gets Louder festival marked the first time two of the "Big Four" (Slayer and Anthrax) had shared the stage with one of the members of the "Big Teutonic Four" of thrash, Kreator. Megadeth – who had not shared the stage with Slayer and Anthrax since the series of "Big Four" shows in 2010-2011 – was initially scheduled to perform at the festival, but cancelled due to Dave Mustaine's illness and was replaced by Kreator.

On how long the farewell tour would last, Exodus vocalist and Holt's bandmate Steve "Zetro" Souza indicated that it would "take a year and a half or two years to do the one final thing, but I believe it's finished. Everybody knows what I know; just because I'm on the outside, I have no insight on that." Kristen Mulderig, who works with Rick Sales Entertainment Group, said that there would still be Slayer-related activities after the tour's conclusion. Despite being referred to as a farewell tour, the band's manager, Rick Sales, said that the tour was not a foreshadowing of their split, but an end of touring. Former Slayer drummer Dave Lombardo did not attend the band's final show.

After finishing the set from their final show at The Forum on November 30, 2019, the band and crew members hugged each other and took group photos, followed by Tom Araya bidding farewell to the fans. Guitarist Gary Holt expressed his gratitude towards the band members and then thanked the fans for making him feel welcomed since joining in 2011.

Setlist

"Repentless"
"Blood Red"
"Disciple"
"Hate Worldwide"
"Mandatory Suicide"
"War Ensemble"
"Jihad"
"Postmortem"
"When the Stillness Comes"
"Payback"
"Seasons in the Abyss"
"Black Magic"
"Dittohead"
"Hell Awaits"
"Chemical Warfare"
"Dead Skin Mask"
"South of Heaven"
"Raining Blood"
"Angel of Death"

Tour dates

Personnel
Tom Araya – vocals, bass
Kerry King – guitars
Paul Bostaph – drums
Gary Holt – guitars

Touring musicians
Phil Demmel – guitars (December 3, 2018 – December 8, 2018)

References

2018 concert tours
2019 concert tours
Slayer concert tours
Farewell concert tours